Donald José Parrales Valverde (born 5 March 1983) is a Nicaraguan professional defender currently playing for Deportivo Walter Ferretti.

Club career
He started his career at Masatepe before joining Diriangén. He moved to Walter Ferretti in 2011.

International career
Parrales made his debut for Nicaragua in a May 2011 friendly match against Cuba and has, as of December 2013, earned a total of 9 caps, scoring no goals. He has represented his country in 3 FIFA World Cup qualification matches and played at the 2013 Copa Centroamericana.

References

External links
 

1983 births
Living people
People from Carazo Department
Nicaraguan men's footballers
Nicaragua international footballers
Diriangén FC players
C.D. Walter Ferretti players
2013 Copa Centroamericana players
2014 Copa Centroamericana players
Association football defenders